Serge Humpich is a person who discovered a serious flaw in the Carte Bleue system used in France for credit cards. He tried to contact banks without success for warning them, and so decided to perform a public "show" where he bought subway tickets while using the flaw in the card system. He was convicted in 2000 to a ten months suspended sentence. He was 36 at the time, and lost his job as a result of the case.

References 
 Ingrand, Cedric (2000-02-26), "French credit card hacker convicted", The Register. https://www.theregister.co.uk/2000/02/26/french_credit_card_hacker_convicted/
 Jessel, Stephen (2000-02-25), "Credit card whistleblower sentenced", BBC. http://news.bbc.co.uk/2/hi/europe/657135.stm
 Webster, Paul (2000-01-22), "Banks fail to give credit to fake smart card 'genius'",The Guardian. http://www.guardian.co.uk/world/2000/jan/22/paulwebster

Other sites 
 Pele, Laurent "French banking smartcard cracked : the story!", http://www.parodie.com/english/smartcard.htm (a time line of events, with links to many articles)
 Brontosaurus (2003-09-25), "Serge Humpich", http://www.everything2.com/title/Serge+Humpich (an Everything2 article on Serge Humpich)

 
Computer criminals
20th-century French criminals
1963 births
People from Mulhouse
Living people
21st-century French criminals